|}

The Magners Plate Handicap Chase is a Premier Handicap National Hunt steeplechase in Great Britain which is open to horses aged five years or older. It is run on the New Course at Cheltenham over a distance of about 2 miles and 4½ furlongs (2 miles 4 furlongs and 127 yards, or 4,139 metres), and during its running there are seventeen fences to be jumped. It is a handicap race, and is scheduled to take place each year during the Cheltenham Festival in March.

History
The race was established in memory of the 2nd Baron Mildmay of Flete (1909–1950), an amateur National Hunt jockey who rode three winners at the Cheltenham Festival. The inaugural race took place in April 1951, because the planned running, in March, had to be abandoned, due to a waterlogged course. It was originally titled the Mildmay of Flete Handicap Chase.

The Racing Post sponsored the race from 2006 to 2008, and during this period it was titled the Racing Post Plate. The 2009 running was named the Freddie Williams Festival Plate, in tribute to Freddie Williams (1942–2008), a popular Scottish bookmaker who owned a pitch at Cheltenham. The construction company Byrne Group supported the event from 2010 to 2014 and from 2015 to 2020 it was sponsored by Brown Advisory and Merriebelle Stable. The bookmaking firm Paddy Power sponsored in 2021. The Craft Irish Whiskey Co. took over the sponsorship from 2022 and the 2023 race was sponsored by Magners. The race held Grade 3 status until 2022 and was reclassified as a Premier Handicap from the 2023 running when Grade 3 status was renamed by the British Horseracing Authority.

Records
Most successful horse (2 wins):
 The Tsarevich – 1985, 1986
 Elfast – 1992, 1994

Leading jockey (3 wins):
 Fred Winter – Slender (1951, dead-heat), Sy Oui (1953), Caesar's Helm (1958)

Leading trainer (4 wins):
 Bobby Renton – Tudor Line (1954), Caesar's Helm (1958), Siracusa (1959), Merry Court (1968)
 Nicky Henderson – The Tsarevich (1985, 1986), Liberthine (2005), Non So (2006)
 Martin Pipe – Terao (1997), Majadou (1999), Dark Stranger (2000), Blowing Wind (2002)

Winners
 Weights given in stones and pounds.

See also
 Horse racing in Great Britain
 List of British National Hunt races

References

 Racing Post:

 pedigreequery.com – Freddie Williams Festival Plate – Cheltenham.
 racenewsonline.co.uk – Racenews Archive (21 February 2008).
 

National Hunt races in Great Britain
Cheltenham Racecourse
National Hunt chases
Recurring sporting events established in 1951
1951 establishments in England